Guillaume Alain Gille (born 12 July 1976) is a retired French handballer and current coach of the French national team.

He was the winner of the gold medal at the 2008 and 2012 Summer Olympics and is the older brother of Bertrand Gille.

Career
Gille's career as a handballer began early. Already in 1984, he was playing for HBC Loriol, followed by a sport étude. From 1996 to 2002, he played for Chambéry SH, before joining HSV Hamburg in the Bundesliga. He has been playing with his brother, Bertrand Gille, since their childhood.

He has been a member of the French national team since 1996. Gille got his debut on 26 November 1996 against Serbia-Montenegro. He has played 276 matches and scored 658 goals in full. He was a play-maker on the team, that won the gold medal at the 2008 Summer Olympics, 2009 World Championships and 2010 European Championships. He has been a part of the French team, that completed a hat-trick by winning in 2008, 2009 and 2010.

Gille was named Hamburgs Sportler des Jahres (Hamburg athlete of the year) in 2010.

Personal life
He has two younger brothers; Bertrand Gille, born in 1978 and Benjamin Gille, born in 1982.

Medals and victories
French Handball champions 2001
Vicechampion in Germany 2004 and 2008
Supercup winner in Germany 2004, 2006 and 2009
German Cup-winner 2006, 2010
French Cup-winner 2002
Winner of Cup Winners Cup 2007
Bronze medal from European Championships 2008
Gold medal from Summer Olympics 2008
World Champion 2009
European Champion 2010
Hamburgs Sportler des Jahres 2009
Gold medal from Summer Olympics 2012

Seasons for HSV Hamburg

References

1976 births
Living people
Sportspeople from Valence, Drôme
French male handball players
French expatriate sportspeople in Germany
Handball players at the 2000 Summer Olympics
Handball players at the 2004 Summer Olympics
Handball players at the 2008 Summer Olympics
Handball players at the 2012 Summer Olympics
Olympic handball players of France
Olympic gold medalists for France
Olympic medalists in handball
Medalists at the 2012 Summer Olympics
Medalists at the 2008 Summer Olympics
Officers of the Ordre national du Mérite
European champions for France
Expatriate handball players
Handball-Bundesliga players
Handball coaches of international teams
21st-century French people